The 1994 New Zealand rugby union tour of Argentina, was a series of seven match played in March–April 1994 by a New Zealand "development team" in Argentina.

It was not an official tour, and no cap were awarded.

It was a young selection (almost 23 years for all the players). A lot of them were after "international" for All Blacks, but also for other country.

The matches 

 ROSARIO:
E.Jurado; G.Romero Acuña, M.Benzi, Molina, Bianchi; G.del Castillo, R.Crexell (capt.); M.Sugasti, L.Oviedo, M.Carmona; R.Pérez, N.Bossicovich; M.Céspedes, D.Silvetti, C.Promanzio. NZ DEVELOPMENT XV:  J.Wilson; G.Konia, L. Stensness, A.Ieremia, P.Cooke; S.Howarth, J.Preston; D.Anglesey (L.Barry),  J. Mitchell  (capt.), B.Larsen; S.Gordon,  Glenn Taylor ;  G.Slater, N.Hewitt, M.Allen. 

ENTRE RIOS:
Pino; Zabala (Zitelli), Torres, P.Raitieri, Rodríguez; Dorigón, Perasso; Bourdin, Di Palma, Manzoni; Reyes, Dall'Ava; Horisberger (C.Raitieri), Lerena (Perren), Uranga (Mendez).  NZ DEVELOPMENT XV: S.Howarth; J.Wilson,  John Leslie,  S.Cottrell, E.Clarke; S.Mannix, J.Marshall;  J. Mitchell  (capt.), L.Barry, T.Blackadder; S..Gordon, M.Cooksley; C.Stevenson, S.McFarland, N.Moore. 

CORDOBA: J.Luna; G.Tomalino, G.Usher, I.Merlo, F.Pereyra; D.Gianantonio, J.Dragotto; D.Rotondo, S.Irazoqui, G.Piergentili; D.Pereyra (capt.), J.Simes; D.Muñoz (Sánchez), I.Ferreyra, A.Rodríguez Araya.. NZ DEVELOPMENT XV:  S.Howarth; J.Wilson, A.Ieremia,  S.Cottrell, P.Cooke; S.Mannix, J.Preston;  J. Mitchell  (capt.), L.Barry, B.Larsen; T.Blackadder, M.Cooksley;  G.Slater  (N.Moore), N.Hewitt, M.Allen. 

 CUYO: E.Saurina; Gatti, P.Cippitelli (capt.), P.Cremaschi, M.Brandi ; Speroni, A.Orri¬co; M.Bertranou, G.Nasazzi, Cassone; Marchiori, V.Bueno; F.Méndez, Pontino, Bartolin .. NZ DEVELOPMENT XV S.Howarth; J.Wilson,  John Leslie,  S.Cottrell, P.Cook; S.Mannix, J.Preston; B.Larsen,  J. Mitchell  (capt.), L.Barry; T.Blackadder, M.Cooksley;  G.Slater, N.Hewitt, M.Allen.

 SUR: Luppino; S.Fernandez, Maffei, Montero, Espíndola; Manson, Rey Saravia; Haddad, Rivas, O.Fernandez; Fornetti, Gadañoto; Schmidt, Giannoni, Góméz.  NZ DEVELOPMENT XV: J.Wilson; G.Konia, A.Ieremia,  John Leslie, P.Cooke; S.Howarth, J.Preston; L.Barry, T.Blackadder, D.Anglesey; M.Cooksley ( J. Mitchell ), S.McFarlane; C.Stevenson, N.Hewitt, M. Allen.

 NORESTE:Gómez Coll (Scordo); Mateo, San Vicente, S.Galazzi, Meabe; Castillo Odena, Godoy; Guarnieri, Marcó, G.Galazzi; García, De Marchi (capt.); Panelli, Fretes, Gualdani. NZ DEVELOPMENT XV: S.Howarth; G.Konia,  S.Cottrell, L. Stensness, E.Clarke; S.Mannix, J.Marshall; L.Barry,  J. Mitchell  (capt.), B.Larsen; S.Gordon, T.Blackadder;  G.Slater, S.Mc Farland, N.Moore.

 BUENOS AIRES: S.Salvat(capt.); H.Rivarola, E.Laborde, D.Cuesta Silva, G.Jorge; D.Forres¬ter, N.Fernandez Miranda; C.Viel, E.Camerlinckx, R.Martín; P.Sporleder, G.Llanes; E.Noriega, J.J.Angelillo, M.Corral. . NZ DEVELOPMENT XV: S.Howarth; J.Wilson, A.Iercrnia,  S.Cottrell, P.Cooke; S.Mannix, J.Preston; L.Barry,  J. Mitchell  (capt.), B.Larsen; S.Gordon, M.Cooksley; C.Stevenson, N.Hewitt, M.Allen.

The Squad 
The player in Bold were later capped for "All Blacks"

References

New Zealand
tour
rugby
Rugby union tours of Argentina